Orange County is located in southern Indiana in the United States. As of 2020, its population was 19,867. The county seat is Paoli. The county has four incorporated settlements with a total population of about 8,600, as well as several small unincorporated communities. It is divided into 10 townships which provide local services. One U.S. route and five Indiana state roads pass through or into the county.

History
Orange County was formed from parts of Knox County, Gibson County and Washington County by the Indiana Territorial Legislature, on December 26, 1815 (effective February 1, 1816). In 1816 the Orange County seat was designated at Paoli, which was named after Pasquale Paoli Ash, the 12-year-old son of the sitting North Carolina Governor.

The early settlers were mostly Quakers fleeing the institution of slavery in Orange County, North Carolina. Jonathan Lindley brought his group of Quakers from North Carolina to the area in 1811. They were the first to build a religious structure, the Lick Creek Meeting House in 1813. It was from this group that Orange County got its name. (See List of Indiana county name etymologies). The name Orange derives from the Dutch Protestant House of Orange, which accessed the English throne with the accession of King William III in 1689, following the Glorious Revolution.

When the North Carolina Quakers came to Indiana, they brought several freed slaves. These free men were deeded  of land in the heart of a dense forest. Word of mouth soon spread the news, and this land became part of the "underground railroad" for runaway slaves. For many years, the freed slaves in this area farmed, traded, and sold their labor to others while living in this settlement. A church and cemetery were constructed.

All that remains today is the cemetery, with many lost or vandalized headstones. Several years ago, Boy Scouts restored the cemetery, replacing the stones with wooden crosses designating a grave. The name of "Little Africa" came about because of the black settlement, but it was called "Paddy's Garden" by its early users.

Courthouse
The first courthouse was a temporary log structure that was built for $25; a more permanent stone structure was completed in 1819 at a cost of $3,950.  In 1847, plans were made for a larger courthouse, which was completed in 1850 at a cost of $14,000. This building is the second oldest courthouse in the state that has been continuously used since its construction. Like the oldest in Ohio County, it is a Greek Revival building with two stories and a Doric portico supported by fluted columns; it has ornamental iron stairs and a clock tower. In 1970, the clock tower was damaged by fire.

Geography

Much of the south part of the county, south of Paoli and French Lick, is part of the Hoosier National Forest. Patoka Lake is within the national forest; the majority of the lake lies in Orange County, with parts extending into neighboring Dubois and Crawford counties.

Adjacent counties
 Lawrence County – north
 Washington County – east
 Crawford County – south
 Dubois County – southwest
 Martin County – northwest

Villages
 French Lick
 Orleans
 Paoli (county seat)
 West Baden Springs

Unincorporated communities

 Abydel
 Bacon
 Bonds
 Bromer
 Chambersburg
 Ethel
 Fargo – called Pittsburgh before 1888
 Greenbrier - also Green Brier
 Hindostan
 Leipsic – called Lancaster before 1852
 Lost River
 Mahan Crossing
 Millersburg
 Newton Stewart
 Norton − called Dillon before 1908
 Orangeville
 Pearsontown
 Pine Valley
 Prospect – called New Prospect before 1853
 Pumpkin Center
 Rego
 Roland
 Scarlet
 Stampers Creek
 Syria
 Trotter Crossing
 Turleys
 Valeene
 Woodlawn Grove
 Youngs Creek – called Unionville before 1867

Townships

 French Lick
 Greenfield
 Jackson
 Northeast
 Northwest
 Orangeville
 Orleans
 Paoli
 Southeast
 Stampers Creek

Transportation

Highways
 U.S. Route 150 – runs east–west through central part of county. Passes French Lick, Turleys, and Paoli.
  Indiana State Road 37 – runs north–south through central part of county. Passes Orleans, Paoli, and Bacon.
  Indiana State Road 56 – enters west line of county at 6.6 miles (10.6 km) north of SW county corner. Runs NE to intersection with US-150 north of West Baden Springs.
  Indiana State Road 60 – runs NW-SE across northeastern tip of county. Enters 2 miles west of NE corner and exits 2 miles south of NE corner.
  Indiana State Road 145 – enters south line of county at 3.7 miles (6 km) from SW county corner. Runs north to intersection with Indiana-56 at French Lick.
  Indiana State Road 337 – runs SE-NW across northeastern part of county. Enters east line of county near Bromer, then runs NW to intersection with Indiana-37 at Orleans.

Airports
 Paoli Municipal Airport - public-owned public-use general-aviation airport with one paved runway.
French Lick Municipal Airport
French Lick Municipal Airport (IATA: FRH, ICAO: KFRH, FAA LID: FRH) is a city-owned public-use airport located three nautical miles (6 km) southwest of the central business district of French Lick, a town in Orange County, Indiana, United States.[1] Also known as French Lick Airport, it serves the French Lick and West Baden, Indiana area.[2]

Railways
French Lick Scenic Railway (French Lick West Baden and Southern Railway/ Indiana Railway Museum) Popular train rides in Indiana aboard the French Lick Scenic Railway offer 20-mile day tours through parts of the Hoosier National Forest, the 2,200-foot Burton Tunnel (Indiana's second longest tunnel), and past limestone outcroppings.

Check the daily departure schedule but know the historic French Lick Scenic Railway also hosts special events and seasonal trips throughout the year, like these famous family attractions:

Wild-West Hold-ups
Tasting Trains
Easter Bunny Express 
Dinner Trains

Climate and weather

Government

The county government is a constitutional body granted specific powers by the Constitution of Indiana and the Indiana Code. The county council is the legislative branch of the county government and controls all spending and revenue collection. Representatives are elected from county districts. The council members serve four-year terms and are responsible for setting salaries, the annual budget and special spending. The council also has limited authority to impose local taxes, in the form of an income and property tax that is subject to state level approval, excise taxes and service taxes.

A board of commissioners is the county's executive body. Commissioners are elected in staggered four-year terms. The board is charged with executing the council's decisions, with collecting revenue, and with managing the county government.

The county maintains a small claims court that can handle some civil cases. The judge on the court is elected to a term of four years and must be a member of the Indiana Bar Association. The judge is assisted by a constable who is elected to a four-year term. In some cases, court decisions can be appealed to the state level circuit court.

The county has several other elected offices, including sheriff, coroner, auditor, treasurer, recorder, surveyor and circuit court clerk. Each serves a four-year term, and oversees a different part of county government. Members elected to county government positions are required to declare party affiliations and be residents of the county.

Each township has a trustee and a three-member board, which administers rural fire protection and ambulance service, provides poor relief and manages cemetery care, among other duties. The trustee and board members are elected to four-year terms.

Orange County is part of Indiana's 9th congressional district. It is part of Indiana Senate districts 44 and 48, and Indiana House of Representatives district 62.

Demographics

As of the 2010 United States Census, there were 19,840 people, 7,872 households, and 5,416 families in the county. The racial makeup of the county was 97.0% white, 0.9% black or African American, 0.3% Asian, 0.3% American Indian, 0.3% from other races, and 1.2% from two or more races. Those of Hispanic or Latino origin made up 1.0% of the population. In terms of ancestry, 22.6% were of English ancestry, 18.8% were of German ancestry and 12.4% were of Irish ancestry.

Of the 7,872 households, 32.3% had children under the age of 18 living with them, 53.4% were married couples living together, 10.4% had a female householder with no husband present, 31.2% were non-families, and 26.7% of all households were made up of individuals. The average household size was 2.49 and the average family size was 3.00. The median age was 40.8 years.

The median income for a household in the county was $47,697 and the median income for a family was $45,874. Males had a median income of $35,679 versus $30,072 for females. The per capita income for the county was $19,119. About 13.5% of families and 20.2% of the population were below the poverty line, including 29.7% of those under age 18 and 14.7% of those age 65 or over.

Education
The county is served by four school districts:
 Lost River Career Cooperative
 Orleans Community Schools
 Paoli Community School Corporation
 Springs Valley Community School Corporation.

Orleans Community Schools (Superintendent: Jimmy Ellis) includes:
 Orleans Elementary School (Principal: Joni Lawyer)
 Orleans Jr./Sr. High School (Principal: Daniel Wolford).

Paoli Community Schools (Superintendent:Greg Walker) includes:
 Throop Elementary School (Principal:Amanda Crews)
 Paoli Jr./Sr. High School (Principal:Dr. Sherry Wise).

Springs Valley School Corporation (Superintendent: Tony Whitaker) includes:
 Springs Valley Elementary School (Principal:Trevor Apple)
 Springs Valley Jr./Sr. High School (Principal: Kyle Neukam)

See also
 National Register of Historic Places listings in Orange County, Indiana

Notes

References

Bibliography

External links
 Orange County website
 Orange County Convention and Visitors Bureau

 
Indiana counties
1816 establishments in Indiana
Populated places established in 1816